Caiyunhu station is a station on Loop line of Chongqing Rail Transit in Chongqing municipality, China. It is located in Jiulongpo District and opened in 2019.

References

Railway stations in Chongqing
Railway stations in China opened in 2019
Chongqing Rail Transit stations